Melanie Adele Martinez (born April 28, 1995) is an American singer and songwriter. Born in Astoria, Queens, and raised in Baldwin, New York, Martinez rose to fame in 2012 after appearing on the American television vocal talent show The Voice. Following the show, she released her debut single "Dollhouse", followed by her debut EP of the same name (2014), through Atlantic Records.

Martinez later released her debut studio album, Cry Baby (2015), which went on to be certified double-platinum by the Recording Industry Association of America (RIAA). Martinez's songs "Sippy Cup", "Mad Hatter", "Mrs. Potato Head", "Cry Baby", "Pacify Her" and "Soap", were all certified gold in the U.S., and her songs "Dollhouse" and "Pity Party" received platinum certification from the RIAA.

Martinez released her second studio album, K–12 (2019), alongside its accompanying film, as a follow up to the storyline of Cry Baby. Her EP was released a year later in 2020, called After School.

Early life 
Melanie Adele Martinez was born on April 28, 1995 in Astoria, Queens, to parents Mery and Jose Martinez, who are of Dominican and Puerto Rican descent. Her family moved to Baldwin, New York, on Long Island, when Martinez was four. She listened to Brandy, Britney Spears, Shakira, The Beatles, Tupac Shakur, Biggie Smalls and Christina Aguilera growing up, and wanted to be a singer from a young age.

Martinez attended Plaza Elementary School, crediting her teacher Mr. Nadien with teaching her how to sing, and in kindergarten, Martinez began writing poetry. Martinez says she had few friends growing up and was a homebody, as she was "very emotional" and found it difficult to explain her feelings, crying when overwhelmed. She practiced photography and painting. Due to her emotionality as a child, she says that others referred to her as a "cry baby", which sparked the creation of the titular character of her debut album, Cry Baby.

Martinez grew up in a "traditional Latin household" where she was made to feel shameful about talking about her sexuality and felt as if she would not be accepted if she came out as bisexual. She says that her family is now fully accepting of her sexuality.

At fourteen, Martinez taught herself how to play guitar by studying chord diagrams of songs she enjoyed, which she found online, and wrote her first song by adding her poetry to one of the chord diagrams, but says that playing guitar "eventually got stale". Martinez graduated from Baldwin High School.

Career

2012: beginnings and The Voice 
In 2012, during her junior year of high school, Martinez participated in the MSG Varsity Talent Show, a televised talent competition. She sang The Beatles' rendition of "Money (That's What I Want)" by Barrett Strong and "Shake Me, Wake Me (When It's Over)" by The Four Tops. She was eliminated in the second round.

Later in 2012, Martinez auditioned for the third season of The Voice. She had not watched the show herself prior to the audition. The initial, untelevised audition was an open call, held at Javits Center. She recalls that while she and her mother were driving to the audition, her mother's car broke down before they reached the Queens–Midtown Tunnel, and the two were forced to "hitchhike" a taxicab in order to get there. Several months after the initial audition, while at Roosevelt Field Mall, Martinez received word that she had advanced to the "second round". She then received multiple callbacks until she was finally selected to audition on the show itself.

Martinez auditioned singing Britney Spears's "Toxic". Three of the four judges, Adam Levine, CeeLo Green and Blake Shelton, hit the "I Want You" button for her. Martinez chose Adam Levine to be her coach.

In the Battle Round, Martinez competed against Caitlin Michele. They performed a duet of the Ellie Goulding song "Lights". Martinez won and moved on to the Knockout Round. Michele was stolen by Cee Lo Green and also moved on. In the Knockout Round, Martinez was paired with Sam James. She chose to sing La Roux's "Bulletproof". Levine eliminated James, and Martinez moved on to the Live Rounds as one of the five remaining members of Team Adam. In week one of the Live Rounds, Martinez sang "Hit the Road Jack". Public vote saved Team Adam members Amanda Brown and Bryan Keith.

Levine then chose Martinez over Loren Allred and Joselyn Rivera to remain in the competition. In week three, Martinez's performance of "Seven Nation Army" finished the voting period at #10 on the iTunes Top 200 Single Chart, causing her iTunes votes to be multiplied by ten. This occurred again in week four, when "Too Close" ended the voting period at #6.
Martinez was eliminated by audience vote in week five, along with the fellow Team Adam member Amanda Brown, leaving Levine with no artists. In response, Martinez said, "I never expected to get this far and this is beyond what I've ever dreamed of. I'm just so glad I got to express who I am as an artist and really touch people's hearts because that was the ultimate goal."

 – Studio version of performance reached the top 10 on iTunes

2013–2014: Dollhouse 
After the show, Martinez began working independently on original material, which she says she spent the majority of 2013 writing. She released her debut single, "Dollhouse", on February 9, 2014.

She later compared the song's story to Edward Scissorhands, saying "[It's] the perfect home with the perfect lawn and they all look the same. But behind each house there's a screwed up group of people who are hiding behind wealth and perfection." Martinez also released a music video for the track, which was fan-funded by an Indiegogo page created by Martinez, and hair, makeup, and shooting were all done by friends of hers. The song was produced and cowritten by NYC songwriting duo Kinetics & One Love.

On April 7, 2014, Martinez signed to Atlantic Records and announced she would tour. She released her debut EP, Dollhouse, on May 19, 2014. The only single from the EP, "Carousel", was also certified gold by the Recording Industry Association of America (RIAA), and featured in a preview for FX's miniseries American Horror Story: Freak Show. The song reached number nine on the Alternative Digital Songs chart. A video for the track was also released.

2015–2017: Cry Baby 
On June 1, 2015, Martinez released the single "Pity Party", which was certified gold by the RIAA, and the chorus of which samples Lesley Gore's "It's My Party". On July 10, 2015, Martinez released the album's second single "Soap". The official music video has over thirty million views on YouTube. It reached number twelve on the Alternative Digital Songs chart, and number sixteen on the Pop Digital Songs chart. "Sippy Cup" followed on July 31, followed by the album fourteen days later. Cry Baby was released on August 14, 2015, to moderate critical acclaim. The album debuted at number 6 on the Billboard 200. Martinez released a Christmas-themed single, "Gingerbread Man", in December 2015. She initially released the song on SoundCloud on December 21, 2015, as a "gift for her fans", but later released the track on iTunes in January 2016 as a single. The music video of her song "Cry Baby" was released on March 14, 2016. The karaoke-style music video for "Alphabet Boy", which Martinez directed, was released on June 2, 2016. Martinez released double feature videos for "Soap" and "Training Wheels" together, as well as "Tag, You're It" and "Milk and Cookies."

Martinez finished recording her second album, describing it as the stories of characters living in Cry Baby's neighborhood. In October 2016, she released a commercial for her fragrance called Cry Baby Perfume Milk, adding that the "idea for this perfume has been cultivating in my brain since the moment I finished writing my album." It was directly distributed by Martinez's record label, Atlantic, making them the first record label to distribute a fragrance. In November 2016, Martinez released her third EP, Cry Baby's Extra Clutter, a physical vinyl release of the bonus tracks from Cry Baby as well as Martinez's single, "Gingerbread Man". She released the music video for her song "Pacify Her" followed in December 2016 by a video for "Mrs. Potato Head".
The video for "Mad Hatter" was released September 23, 2017. Cry Baby was certified Platinum on February 24, 2017.

2017–2019: K–12 album and film 
In March 2017, Martinez expressed her wishes to produce a film telling the story of each song from her second album, explaining "I'm currently writing a film... I'm going to spend the year working on it, directing, shooting, make up and everything so it's a lot of work". On May 15, 2019, Martinez released the first teaser trailer for the album revealing the title K–12, released on September 6, with the album cover unveiled a day later through Instagram. While the film was available in select theaters worldwide, Martinez also posted the film to YouTube and included it in a version of the downloadable K–12 album. In an interview with PeopleTV, Melanie mentioned that she has two sequels and two visual albums planned to follow on from the K–12 album and film. She said, "I have my next film planned out, as far as what I want to do, and the film after that and they both have albums attached to them...Hopefully [the process] will be faster this time and it won't be like four years because I've done it at least once and I'm past all those learning curves that I had to kind of reach and figure out."

2020–2022: After School 
In January 2020, Martinez announced an EP titled After School, revealing the title through her Instagram stories. The EP would serve as a deluxe edition of K–12, however is not connected to K–12 in terms of timeline. On February 10, 2020, Martinez's management issued the first single from After School, titled "Copy Cat". The song features American rapper and songwriter Tierra Whack. This marks the first time that Whack has worked in a professional capacity with Melanie Martinez, and the first time that Melanie Martinez has featured another artist in one of her songs. Martinez later released a second single from the EP, "Fire Drill", on June 26, 2020. The song had previously been featured in the credits sequence of her film, K–12.

Her song "Play Date", originally released on the deluxe edition of Cry Baby in 2015, became one of the top 100 most-played songs on Spotify in the US after gaining popularity on the video-sharing application, TikTok.

2023–present: Portals 
On February 18, 2023, after archiving all her Instagram posts, Martinez teased her new album Portals by posting an Instagram video of a mushroom in a foggy, dream-like forest, with "RIP Cry Baby" engraved in its stem, accompanied by a snippet of a new song. Several more teasers were posted over the next few days on all her social media platforms. On March 17, 2023, "Death" was released as the album's lead single. Martinez performed at 2023 Lollapalooza on the 19th of March to promote Portals.

Artistry

Musical style 
Martinez's music has been described as pop, alternative pop, art pop, electropop, emo pop, and dark-pop.

Her debut album Cry Baby and second album K–12 were seen to have hip hop and R&B undertones.

The subject matter of Martinez's songs is typically based on personal experiences. Martinez describes her own music as "very dark and honest" and "hip hop/trap inspired beats with creepy nostalgic childlike sounds such as baby pianos, music boxes, and toys".

Martinez's music has been described by The Guardian as "off-kilter, sweary electropop". Rolling Stone described Martinez's music as "twisted lullabies about love, danger and madness", and compared her music to that of "'Coin-Operated Boy'-era Dresden Dolls" and Lana Del Rey. The New York Timess
Jon Pareles described her music as "perch[ing] prettily tinkling keyboards and concise pop choruses amid the slow, ominous basslines and twitchy percussion of Southern hip-hop – a candy-coated variation on the dirges of Lorde and Lana Del Rey", and described her mezzo-soprano voice as "whispery, sardonic, tearful, [and] furious". Billboards Jason Lipshutz also compared Martinez to Del Rey and Lorde, saying, "Martinez is clearly cribbing from the dimly lit pop stylings of Lorde and Lana Del Rey, but while her wispy delivery strikes the same femme fatale poses, she lacks the subtlety of her influences", and that "Martinez is admirably ambitious, but her insistence on sticking to Cry Babys central idea leaves her contorting into uncomfortable positions". The Guardian called her image "doll-like and decidedly emo...hyperreal", and described her music as "part-nursery rhyme, part tragic life story".

Martinez describes her alter ego and the protagonist of her debut album, Cry Baby, as a "fairy tale" version of herself.

Influences 

Martinez has cited the Beatles, Neutral Milk Hotel, Feist, Kimbra, Zooey Deschanel, Regina Spektor, and CocoRosie as influences of hers. Specific albums which have influenced her music include The Idler Wheel... by Fiona Apple and Ariana Grande's albums Yours Truly and My Everything. She attributes the "heavy hip-hop influence" in her music to her father playing hip-hop music in the family's house often during her childhood.

The visuals in Martinez's music videos have been influenced by her favorite visual artists: Mark Ryden, Aleksandra Waliszewska and Nicoletta Ceccoli. She named Tim Burton as a large influence of hers, and has said that to make a movie with him would be her "one dream".

Personal life 
Martinez is bisexual.

Endorsements and products 
Martinez collaborated with cosmetics company Lime Crime, Inc. to release two "exclusive" lipsticks: a blue lipstick called "Cry Baby" on August 17, 2015, and a brown lipstick called "Teddy Bear" on March 9, 2016. On October 25, 2016, she released a commercial for a new fragrance called Cry Baby Perfume Milk. It was directly distributed by Martinez's label, the first record label to distribute a fragrance.

Public image 
At age sixteen, after watching 101 Dalmatians, Martinez dyed half of her hair blonde, in the same vein as Cruella de Vil. She became known for the look, as well as her "baby doll"-inspired outfits in music videos and when performing.

Sexual assault allegation 
On December 4, 2017, Timothy Heller, a woman with whom Martinez once shared a friendship, alleged via Twitter that Martinez had sexually assaulted and raped her. The following day, Martinez tweeted a response to Heller's accusations, saying the allegations "horrified and saddened" her, and that Heller "never said no to what [they] chose to do together". On December 9, 2017, Martinez released a second statement, thanking her fans for citing Heller's "false statements". She concluded the statement with: "...I would never be intimate with someone without their absolute consent." Martinez released the song "Piggyback" on SoundCloud, an act believed to be in response to Heller's accusations.

Discography 
Studio albums
 Cry Baby (2015)
 K-12 (2019)
 Portals (2023)

Filmography

Film

Television

Web

Tours 
Headlining
 Dollhouse Tour (2014–2015)
 Cry Baby Tour (2015–2017)
 K–12 Tour (2019–2020)

Supporting
 Lindsey Stirling – Music Box Tour (2015)
 Adam Lambert – The Original High Tour (2016)

Awards and nominations

See also 
 List of Puerto Ricans

Notes

References

External links 
 
 

1995 births
Living people
21st-century American singers
Art pop musicians
Bisexual singers
Bisexual songwriters
Bisexual photographers
Bisexual women
LGBT people from New York (state)
American LGBT singers
American LGBT songwriters
American LGBT photographers
American women pop singers
American child singers
American musicians of Puerto Rican descent
American music video directors
American singers of Dominican Republic descent
Atlantic Records artists
Electropop musicians
Musicians from the New York metropolitan area
People from Baldwin, Nassau County, New York
People from Long Island
Photographers from New York (state)
Singer-songwriters from New York (state)
The Voice (franchise) contestants
21st-century American women singers
American women in electronic music
21st-century American women photographers
LGBT Hispanic and Latino American people
20th-century LGBT people
21st-century LGBT people
Hispanic and Latino American women singers